The Mazda L-series is a mid-sized inline 4-cylinder gasoline piston engine designed by Mazda as part of their MZR family, ranging in displacement from 1.8L to 2.5L. Introduced in 2001, it is the evolution of the cast-iron block F-engine. The L-series is used by Ford as their 1.8L to 2.5L Duratec world engine.

The L-engine uses a chain-driven DOHC, 16-valve valvetrain with an all-aluminum block construction and cast-iron cylinder liners. Other features include fracture-split forged powder metal connecting rods and a one-piece cast crankshaft.

Other features are intake cam-phasing VVT, VTCS, VICS, a stainless steel 4:1 exhaust manifold and a lower main bearing cage for increased block rigidity. Direct-injection is available on the 2.0 L LF-VD and the award-winning (DISI) turbocharged  L3-VDT engine introduced in 2006 for the Mazdaspeed lineup of vehicles.

In 2010, Ford introduced a GDI turbo variant of the Mazda LF engine design as the EcoBoost 2.0L, using Ford's own manifold and engine control systems. Ford plans to use the L-engine well into the future for their EcoBoost and Duratec 4-cylinder generations. In 2011, Mazda ceased to develop the L-engine and replaced it with the SkyActiv-G engine - an extensively revised evolution of the Mazda L-engine. At this time, Ford will be the only manufacturer still using the Mazda L-engine design.

1.8 L (L8-DE, L8-VE) 
The 1.8 L version has a nearly-square  bore and a  stroke.

In 2001, Ford introduced its first European Ford engine to use gasoline direct injection technology, badged SCi (Smart Charge injection) for Direct-Injection-Spark-Ignition (DISI). The range will include some turbocharged derivatives, including the 1.1-litre, three-cylinder turbocharged unit showcased at the 2002 Geneva Show. The 1.8 L was the first European Ford engine to use direct injection technology, badged SCi for Smart Charge Injection.  This appeared in the Mondeo in 2003 and is today available on the 2.0 L engine as well.

The SCi engines were designed at Ford's Cologne facility and assembled in Valencia, Spain. The SCi engine is paired with a specially designed six-speed manual transmission.

European 1.8 L and 2.0 L Duratec HE engines are built at the Valencia Engine Plant in Spain. Duratec FFV is a flex fuel version of the 1.8 L Duratec-HE modified to run on E85 fuel. 1.8L Focus C-Max and Focus Mk II versions use a drive-by-wire throttle to improve responsiveness.

 2002-2012 Mazda6 for Europe
 2004-2018 Mazda Premacy/Mazda5
 2005-2015 Mazda MX-5 for Europe
 2000-2007 Ford Mondeo
 2005-2010 Ford Focus
 2006-2009 Morgan 4/4 1800

2.0 L (LF-DE, LF-VE, LF-VD) 

The 2.0 L version has 10.0:1 compression ratio, an  bore and it shares the  stroke of the 1.8 L. Changes to the engine include switching from a cast aluminum to a reinforced plastic intake manifold and from Sequential multi-port fuel injection to gasoline direct injection.

This engine is also used by Volvo, called B4204S3 (or B4204S4 as Flexifuel engine capable of running on E85).

California legal emissions PZEV cars utilized advanced air injection into the oem tubular manifold to not only lower emissions, but raise engine efficiency. The 2009 Focus had  when equipped with manual transmission due to a higher flowing exhaust system pulled from the 2006/2007 models.

Mazda's LF-VD version was equipped with Direct Injection Spark Ignition (DISI) and a higher compression ratio for improved efficiency in the JDM and EDM markets.

In 2011 Ford started selling the third generation Ford Focus in North America which comes with an updated version that utilizes direct injection and  Ti-VCT. This version is referred to as the "Duratec 20."

The Ford Duratec 20 engines are built in Dearborn, Michigan, United States, and Chihuahua, Mexico, with some being built by Mazda in Hiroshima, Japan.

The plastic intake manifold on early versions of the 1.8 and 2.0 has a major fault due to poor-quality materials.  The manifold has swirlplates mounted on a square shaft at the aperture where it mounts to the cylinder head. Early four-cylinder Duratec engines can be ruined when the swirlplates break off and enter a cylinder.  Most cases are of single swirlplates but also the shaft can wear and break. Early signs of this fault are evidenced by a ticking noise emanating from the front of the engine. This can occur as early as 25K miles, with failure typically occurring after about 90,000 miles.  

A turbocharged Ford EcoBoost version was introduced in 2010.

 2004–2008 Mazda Axela/Mazda3
 2002–2008 Mazda6 for Europe
 2006–2007 Mazda Premacy/Mazda5
 2006–2015 Mazda MX-5/Roadster
 2008–2018 Mazda Biante
 2007–2010 Ford C-Max
 2004–present Ford EcoSport
 2004–2018 Ford Focus
 2000–2007 Ford Mondeo
 2010–2012 Ford Transit Connect
 2006–2010 Volvo C30
 2007–2010 Volvo S40
 2007–2010 Volvo V50
 2008–2010 Volvo V70
 2007–2010 Volvo S80
 2006–2012 Besturn B70
 2015–2016 Zenos E10
 2006–2012 Caterham 7 Superlight R300/400/500
 2008–2014 Caterham 7 Roadsport 175/200
 2009–2015 Caterham 7 CSR 175
 2012–present Caterham 7 420/620R/S (supercharged)
 2014–present Caterham 7 335/360/420/480/485
 2012–2016 Caterham 7 Supersport R
 2011–present Caterham-Lola SP/300.R (supercharged)
 2005–2020 Morgan +4
 2008–2018 Mitsuoka Himiko
 2015–present Tatuus-Cosworth MSV F4-016 (developed by Cosworth)
2010–2016 Ginetta G40R
2000s–present Dare Ginetta G12

2.3L (L3-VE, L3-NS, L3-DE) 

The  version uses the same  bore as the 2.0 L but with a long  stroke.

The 23EW was built in Chihuahua, Mexico for transverse installation in several front-drive Ford/Mercury/Mazda vehicles through the 2009 model year. "EW" in the Ford designation code denotes East-West configuration, or transverse mounting. Three versions of the 23EW have been produced. An iVCT (intake variable cam timing)-equipped DOHC 16V version was used in the 2006–2009 Ford Fusion/Mercury Milan, and several generations of CD2-based crossovers.

The 23NS was built in Dearborn, Michigan, for the Ford Ranger and North American market Mazda B-Series from the 2001 model year to the 2011 model year. "NS" denotes North-South configuration, or longitudinal mounting. These engines are tuned for torque-bias making them suitable for light-truck use and are not equipped with iVCT or VICS. There are two versions of the 23NS with slight differences:

The Duratec 23E is a version of the Duratec 23 which meets California PZEV emissions standards.

A high-efficiency Atkinson cycle version was used in the Ford Escape, Mercury Mariner, and Mazda Tribute Hybrids.

 2001–2010 Mazda B-Series
 2002–2005 Mazda MPV
 2003–2008 Mazda Atenza/Mazda6
 2004–2007 Mazda Axela/Mazda3
 2004–2008 Mazda Tribute
 2006–2010 Mazda Premacy/Mazda5
 2008–2018 Mazda Biante
 2001–2011 Ford Ranger
 2003–2007 Ford Focus
 2005–2008 Ford Escape/Mercury Mariner
 2006–2009 Ford Fusion/Mercury Milan
 2010–BAC Mono (developed by Cosworth)
 2006–2012 Besturn B70
 2004–? Caterham 7 CSR 200/260 (developed by Cosworth)
2000s–present Dare Ginetta G12

2.3L DISI Turbo (L3-VDT)

Introduced in 2005 with the Mazdaspeed6, the L3-VDT is an award-winning turbocharged version of the 2.3 with direct injection spark ignition, or "DISI" is also pronounced.

The L3-VDT features a bore of 87.5 mm and a stroke of 94.0 mm, identical to the naturally aspirated L3-VE. The 16V setup is controlled by a chain driven DOHC. 

L3s produced prior to 2010 are notorious for losing tension in the chain. The loose timing chain causes the timing of the engine and the VVT in particular to be improperly timed, often resulting in cylinders colliding with the valves.

In 2010 the L3-VDT was revised to fix some of the common failures, the shape of the cylinder head was reworked, possibly to concentrate fuel near the sparkplug, the ECU was made faster and featured more air/fuel cells to reduce the chance of the engine leaning out. Another change was a fix for the timing chain tension issues. The turbo seals were also updated. 

While the 2.0 Ford EcoBoost engine and its later 2.3 variant share a cylinder block with the L3-VDT and are derived from the Mazda L architecture, little else is shared between the EcoBoost and L3-VDT and they should not be confused with one another. The EcoBoost engines have different turbochargers, Ford-designed heads, different direct injection systems along with featuring Ford's Ti-VCT variable valve timing system instead of Mazda's S-VT.

 2005–2007 Mazda Atenza MPS/Mazda6 MPS/Mazdaspeed6
 2006–2010 Mazda MPV (JDM only)
 2006–2012 Mazda CX-7
 2006–2012 Mazda Axela MPS/Mazdaspeed3

2.5 L (L5-VE) 
Introduced in non-North American markets for the MY2008 and North American markets for MY2009, the 2.5L L5-VE is an updated, bored and stroked version of the L3-VE 2.3L. The  L5 4-cylinder engine has an  bore and a  stroke, with a compression ratio of 9.7:1. The standard crankshaft is cast iron with eight counterweights. To increase durability of the bore, Mazda uses cast iron for the cylinder liners. This offers enhanced high-heat tolerance as well as reduced friction. It also uses iVCT.

Ford has developed an Atkinson cycle variant of the Mazda L5 engine for use in the Ford Fusion Hybrid and Ford Maverick Hybrid vehicles. They also used this variant under the Duratec engine family name in the 2010-2019 Ford Fusion. This engine was named one of Ward's 10 Best Engines for 2010. Fuel saving features include adaptive knock control and aggressive deceleration fuel cutoff. This and the 2.3 L competed with Toyota's 2.4 L 2AZ-FE engine, sharing similar technology.

2008–2012 Mazda Atenza/Mazda6 (non-North America)
2009–2013 Mazda6 (North America)
2009-2012 Mazda CX-7 (North America & Australia)
2009–2011 Mazda Tribute
2010–2013 Mazda Axela/Mazda3
2009–2019 Ford Escape
2010–2020 Ford Fusion
2011–2014 Ford Ranger (Australia)
2014–2018 Ford Transit Connect
2022–present Ford Maverick Hybrid
2010–2011 Mercury Milan
2012 Lincoln MKZ Hybrid
2000s–present Dare Ginetta G12

MZR-R
In late 2006, Mazda announced an agreement with Advanced Engine Research (AER) to develop the MZR-R motor for sports car racing.  The engine is a 2.0 L turbocharged I4 based on the production MZR block. The engine will initially be used by the Mazda factory team in the American Le Mans Series as a replacement for their R20B rotary, then later sold to customer teams.

See also
 Mazda MZR engine
 Mazda F engine
 List of Mazda engines
 Ford Duratec engine

References

External links

MAZDA engine codes

MZR
2001 introductions
Straight-four engines
Gasoline engines by model